Zoroaster is an American sludge metal band from Atlanta, Georgia, formed in 2003. The original line-up was Brent Anderson on bass and vocals with Will Fiore (guitar, vocals) and Todd Fiore (drums), all of whom had previously been members of Terminal Doom Explosion. So far they have released four studio albums, Zoroaster in 2005, Dog Magic in 2007, Voice of Saturn in 2009, and Matador in 2010. They are currently signed to E1 Music.

Discography
Zoroaster (2005), Battle Kommand Records
Dog Magic (2007), Battle Kommand Records
Voice of Saturn (2009), Terminal Doom Records
Matador (2010), E1 Entertainment

Other appearances
Metal Swim - Adult Swim compilation album (2010)

References

External links
Zoroaster at Last.fm
Zoroaster at Myspace

Musical groups established in 2003
American sludge metal musical groups
American doom metal musical groups